Talanoa Hufanga (born February 1, 2000) is an American football safety for the San Francisco 49ers of the National Football League (NFL). He played college football at USC.

Early years
Hufanga attended Crescent Valley High School in Corvallis, Oregon. He played safety, wide receiver, and quarterback.  As a senior in 2017, he was the Polynesian High School National Player of the Year. He played in the 2018 U.S. Army All-American Game. Hufanga committed to the University of Southern California (USC) to play college football.

College career
As a true freshman at USC in 2018, Hufanga played in eight games with five starts before suffering a season-ending broken collarbone. He finished the season with 51 tackles. As a sophomore in 2019, he started all 10 games he played in and recorded 90 tackles and 3.5 sacks. Hufanga returned to USC as a starter his junior year in 2020. He and BYU quarterback Zach Wilson were selected as co-recipients of the 2020 Polynesian College Football Player of the Year Award. For the 2020 season, Hufanga was a Consensus All-American. In addition, he won Pac-12 Defensive Player of the Year.

Collegiate statistics

Professional career 

Hufanga was drafted by the San Francisco 49ers in the fifth round, 180th overall, of the 2021 NFL Draft. He signed his four-year rookie contract on May 13, 2021.

During his rookie campaign, Hufanga appeared in 15 games and made three starts. In the Divisional Round of the playoffs against the Green Bay Packers, he recovered and returned a blocked punt for a critical touchdown which eventually set up a 13–10 victory for the 49ers.

In Week 4 of the 2022 season, against the Los Angeles Rams, he had 52-yard pick six in the 24–9 victory. He started in all 17 regular season games and all three playoff games for the 49ers in the 2022 season. He had 97 total tackles, four interceptions, nine passes defended, and two forced fumbles. He earned a Pro Bowl nomination and first team All-Pro honors.

NFL career statistics

Regular season

Personal life
Hufanga is of Tongan descent. He is the son of Tevita and Tanya Hufanga and has a brother named T. J.

References

External links

San Francisco 49ers bio
USC Trojans bio

2000 births
Living people
Sportspeople from Corvallis, Oregon
Players of American football from Oregon
American football safeties
USC Trojans football players
All-American college football players
San Francisco 49ers players